Michael George Gibbins (12 March 1949 – 4 October 2005) was a Welsh musician, most notable for being the drummer of Badfinger.

Early life
Mike Gibbins was born on 12 March 1949 in Swansea, Wales. He began playing drums at age 14, and joined his first band, "The Club 4" in the early 1960s. He played around South Wales for a time with a group called "The Misfits" before auditioning for the rival Welsh band The Iveys in 1964.

The Iveys 
Iveys member Ron Griffiths invited Gibbins to audition for the group in 1964, when Gibbins was 15. Members Pete Ham, Dai Jenkins, and Griffiths subsequently invited Gibbins, who reluctantly had to cut his hair from a rocker style to that of a mod in order to join. In 1966, Tom Evans replaced Jenkins, and in 1968, The Iveys were signed to the Beatles' Apple Records. In 1969, Paul McCartney produced the song "Come and Get It" for The Iveys, who prior to its release, changed their name to Badfinger and replaced Griffiths with guitarist Joey Molland.

Badfinger
After the success of "Come and Get It", Badfinger enjoyed success with hit songs "No Matter What", "Day After Day", and "Baby Blue". From early on, Gibbins began to contribute songs to the albums, despite often being overshadowed by the compositions of the other members, particularly Ham. Gibbins briefly left the group in 1972 to record a solo album with friends in Wales, but abandoned the project to return to Badfinger. Gibbins wrote "It Had to Be" for the album No Dice, "Cowboy" for the album Ass, "My Heart Goes Out" for the self-titled album of 1974, and the songs "Your So Fine" and the first half of the medley "In the Meantime/Some Other Time" for the album Wish You Were Here. With the exceptions of "It Had to Be" and "Your So Fine", Gibbins also contributed lead vocals on his songs. He also composed and sang the originally unreleased songs "Loving You" (from the unreleased sessions for the album Straight Up), "Rockin' Machine", and "Back Again" (from the unreleased album Head First). All of these recordings have now been issued on CD.

During his tenure with Badfinger, Gibbins - along with the other members of the band - contributed musically to the George Harrison album All Things Must Pass, and played at The Concert for Bangladesh. While working on All Things Must Pass, producer Phil Spector recognized Gibbins' talent at playing the tambourine, earning Gibbins the nickname "Mr. Tambourine Man" after the Bob Dylan song.

After Pete Ham's suicide in 1975, Badfinger broke up and Gibbins found work as a session drummer in Wales. One of the more notable songs that Gibbins played on during this time was "It's a Heartache" by Bonnie Tyler.

In 1978, Joey Molland and Tom Evans reunited as Badfinger. They contacted Gibbins, who flew to Los Angeles to record for the album Airwaves, but after disagreeing with its producer, Gibbins walked out of the sessions and was replaced by a session drummer. Gibbins did not participate in the final Badfinger album, Say No More.

After Evans and Molland split in 1982, Gibbins joined Evans and Bob Jackson to create another Badfinger to rival that of Molland. Gibbins soon quit, and Evans committed suicide in 1983. A year later, Gibbins, Jackson, and Molland toured as Badfinger for a brief period.

Later years and death
Gibbins reunited as Badfinger with Molland for a few tours beginning in 1986, but retired from touring soon after to spend more time with his family. He recommenced touring in the late 1990s, starting his own band Madfinger which featured ex-Iveys bassist Ron Griffiths.

Gibbins released four albums later in his life, A Place in Time, More Annoying Songs, Archeology and In the Meantime featuring his own compositions.

Gibbins died from a brain aneurysm in his sleep at his Florida home on 4 October 2005 at the age of 56. Speaking of his bandmate, Molland said "I spoke to Mike on Monday afternoon. He was in good spirits and we were looking forward to seeing each other at the 'Bangladesh' re-release event on Oct. 17. Mike and I had a falling out some time ago but we had been very much in touch with each other over the last five or six months, I'm happy to say, and we were starting to talk about the future. When we talked it was usually about the Badfinger business both past and future. He was still angry that Peter had committed suicide rather than sticking it out. Mike was a great friend to us all, a great rock drummer, father, and husband. Courageous and honest in all things, he will be sorely missed by all who knew him."

References

External links
 

1949 births
2005 deaths
Badfinger members
Musicians from Swansea
Welsh singer-songwriters
20th-century Welsh musicians
20th-century Welsh male singers
Deaths from intracranial aneurysm
Welsh rock drummers
Welsh expatriates in the United States